Table tennis competitions at the 2003 Pan American Games in Santo Domingo were held from August 7 to 13, 2003 at the Table tennis center. The winners of the tournament secured a place at the 2004 Summer Olympics.

Singles

Doubles

See also
 List of Pan American Games medalists in table tennis

References

Events at the 2003 Pan American Games
Pan American Games
2003
2003 Pan American Games